The 2021 World Jiu-Jitsu Championship or World 2021 IBJJF Jiu-Jitsu Championship was an international jiu-jitsu event organised by the International Brazilian Jiu-Jitsu Federation (IBJFF) and held at the Anaheim Convention Center in Anaheim, California, from 9-12 December 2021. This 25th edition of the most prestigious Brazilian jiu-jitsu tournament was the first one to take place following the COVID-19 pandemic and the cancellation of the 2020 season, it saw the emergence of a brand new generation of world champions.

Background 
The 2021 IBJJF World Jiu-Jitsu Championship was the first season of the World Jiu-Jitsu Championship, the most prestigious event in the sport, to take place following the 2019 IBJJF World edition. The previous 2020 edition was cancelled by the organising International Brazilian Jiu-Jitsu Federation as a consequence of the COVID-19 pandemic.

This 25th edition took place for the first time at the Anaheim Convention Center in Anaheim, California instead of the Walter Pyramid in Long Beach where it had been held since 2007 after moving from Brazil to the United States. This edition also took place for the first time at the end of the year instead of the beginning of the year like previous edition, giving more time for athletes to be able to participate. The black belts competition took place towards the end, on 11 December and 12 December (two days); the elimination round and the open class / absolute division matches took place on the first day, Saturday 11 December followed by the quarterfinals all the way to the finals on Sunday 12 December, the last day of the tournament.

This Championship saw Checkmat winning its first world team title, Dream Art competing for its first year as a team and a new generation of black belts winning their first gold medals, such as Tainan Dalpra who was the first black belt to represent Art Of Jiu Jitsu (AOJ) at the IBJJF World final.

Men's division 
In the roosterweight division, Mikey Musumeci became world champion for the fourth time in a row, the first American to do so at black belt, representing his new team, Pedigo Submission Fighting for the first time, after beating ten time world champion Bruno Malfacine by points. In the ultra heavy division semifinal Nicholas Meregali was disqualified from the tournament, after winning his match, for giving the finger to a heckler in the audience.

Men's medallists 
Adult male black belt results

Women's division 
After one of the longest career in the sport and 13 years since receiving her black belt from Fabio Gurgel, "the queen of the heaviest weightclass" Gabi Garcia, after getting submitted for the first time in over 10 years, announced her retirement from gi competition to concentrate on her MMA career.
Bia Mesquita won her 7th world title after defeating Luiza Monteiro by points while Gabrieli Pessanha won double gold.

Women's medallists 
Adult female black belt results

Teams results 
For this season Checkmat brought 102 competitors, Gracie Barra counted 87, Grappling Fight Team known as GF Team 48, Unity Jiu Jitsu 46, and Art of Jiu-Jitsu who had just separated in early 2020 from Atos 29 athletes.

See also 
World IBJJF Jiu-Jitsu Championship
European IBJJF Jiu-Jitsu Championship
Pan IBJJF Jiu-Jitsu Championship

References 

World Jiu-Jitsu Championship